Abarema longipedunculata is a species of legume in the family Fabaceae. It is endemic to Bolívar, Venezuela.

References

longipedunculata
Endemic flora of Venezuela
Near threatened plants
Taxonomy articles created by Polbot